Piombino Dese is a comune (municipality) in the Province of Padua in the Italian region Veneto, located about  northwest of Venice and about  north of Padua.

Piombino Dese borders the following municipalities: Camposampiero, Istrana, Loreggia, Morgano, Resana, Trebaseleghe, Vedelago, Zero Branco.

Palladio's Villa Cornaro can be found in the comune's territory.

References

Cities and towns in Veneto